TSS Maianbar was a coastal steamship of the North Coast Steam Navigation Company. Built in Scotland in 1910 she ran aground in Newcastle, New South Wales in 1940 and was later scrapped on site.

History
Ardrossan Dry Dock & Ship Building Co Ltd, of Ardrossan, Scotland built Maianbar in 1910 for the North Coast Steam Navigation Company. She replaced the one-year-old Minimbah, a  steamship that broke her back after unsuccessfully trying to cross the Manning River Bar earlier that year. Minimbahs engine and boiler were salvaged, shipped back to Scotland and installed in Maianbar. The engine was a 99 RHP two-cylinder compound steam engine built by David Rowan & Co of Glasgow.

In 1920, Maianbar was beached at the entrance to Macleay River and took a month to be re-floated.

In 1937, the Port Stephens Steamship Company bought Maianbar from the North Coast Steam Navigation Co. In 1940 her original owners bought the vessel back, and on 5 May started towing her back from Port Stephens to Sydney. In fine weather off Newcastle the towline broke and she ran aground on Nobbys Beach. The ship could not be re-floated and was scrapped on site.

References

External links
 Shipwrecks of the Newcastle Region including Oyster Bank and the Hunter River
 Encyclopaedia of Australian Shipwrecks
 C917-0234b Maianbar beached near Nobby's, 1940
 H5327 Half-ship model, TSS 'Maianbar', wood / metal / glass, made by Ardrossan Dry Dock & Shipping Co Ltd, Scotland for the North Coast Steam Navigation Co, New South Wales, Australia, 1910

Interwar period ships of Australia
Iron and steel steamships of Australia
Maritime incidents in May 1940
Merchant ships of Australia
Ships built in Scotland
Shipwrecks of the Hunter Region
1910 ships